Todd James Smith (born March 3, 1984) is an American professional wrestler currently signed to WWE, where he performs on the SmackDown brand under the ring name Ivar.

He is also known under the ring name Hanson, which he used from 2013 to 2019. Smith and Raymond Rowe (now known as Erik), have been a regular tag team since 2014, initially under the name War Machine, then later War Raiders, The Viking Experience, and The Viking Raiders. Smith and Rowe have held tag team championships on two continents, being two times IWGP Tag Team Champions in Japan and having won the ROH World Tag Team Champion, the NXT Tag Team Championship and the WWE Raw Tag Team Championship in the United States.

Professional wrestling career

Early career (2001–2013)
Trained by Killer Kowalski, Smith made his debut in 2001. For the next several years, he worked for a number of independent professional wrestling promotions throughout New England, most notably New England Championship Wrestling and Chaotic Wrestling. Well known for his tag team background, he was part of The Trendsetters with Max Bauer and Pretty Psycho with Psycho. He and Brian Milonas were also the head instructors at the Chaotic Wrestling training facility in North Andover, Massachusetts.

Smith appeared on Velocity on December 16, 2005, losing to Doug Basham. The following year, on September 15, 2006, he appeared on SmackDown as Todd Hansen in a losing effort to Sylvester Terkay.

On February 16, 2008, Smith defeated Brandon Locke for the NECW Television Championship in Quincy, Massachusetts. The title was vacated on April 22, 2008, due to an injury Smith suffered in a title defense. On June 1, 2008, Smith became the champion again after defeating Chase Del Monte in a tournament final held at Suffolk Downs. In late 2008 a series of vignettes featuring Smith began to air during Chaotic Wrestling live events and on the web, showed Handsome Johnny discovering himself on a trip abroad and lead to the introduction of "The Duke of Elegance" Don Chesterfield into Chaotic storylines. Smith also used this character for the Eastern Wrestling Alliance as well as Front Row Wrestling. In NECW, he changed his ring name in 2010 to "Handsome" Johnny Hayes.

Ring of Honor (2013–2017)
Smith made his ROH debut on July 27 a losing effort in a four-corner survival also featuring Brian Fury, Kongo, and Vinny Marseglia. A few months after this, he was announced as the eighth participant in the 2014 edition of the Top Prospect Tournament. He defeated Cheeseburger and Andrew Everett in the opening rounds before going on to win the tournament at Wrestling's Finest by defeating Raymond Rowe in the final. As a result, he earned an ROH World Television Championship match against reigning champion Tommaso Ciampa at the 12th Anniversary Show, but was unsuccessful.

He then formed a tag team with Raymond Rowe known as War Machine. On April 11, 2014, Hanson and Rowe both signed contracts with ROH. On August 22, 2015, War Machine defeated Killer Elite Squad (Davey Boy Smith Jr. and Lance Archer) in a non-title match and afterwards challenged them to a match for their GHC Tag Team Championship, a title owned by the Japanese Pro Wrestling Noah promotion. War Machine received their title shot in Japan on September 19, but were defeated by the Killer Elite Squad. On December 18 at Final Battle, War Machine defeated The Kingdom (Matt Taven and Michael Bennett) to win the ROH World Tag Team Championship. They lost the title to The Addiction (Christopher Daniels and Frankie Kazarian) on May 9, 2016, at War of the Worlds. War Machine's final appearance with ROH was on December 16, 2017.

Japan (2015–2018)
On September 14, 2015, Hanson and Rowe made their Japanese debuts for Pro Wrestling Noah, teaming with Takashi Sugiura in a six-man tag team main event, where they defeated Suzuki-gun (Davey Boy Smith Jr., Lance Archer, and Minoru Suzuki). This led to a match five days later, where War Machine unsuccessfully challenged Smith and Archer for the GHC Tag Team Championship.

In November 2016, War Machine made their debut for New Japan Pro-Wrestling (NJPW) by entering the 2016 World Tag League. They finished the tournament on December 7 with a record of four wins and three losses, failing to advance to the finals.

On April 9, 2017, at Sakura Genesis 2017, War Machine defeated Tencozy (Hiroyoshi Tenzan and Satoshi Kojima) to win the IWGP Tag Team Championship. They lost the title to Guerrillas of Destiny (Tama Tonga and Tanga Loa) on June 11 at Dominion 6.11 in Osaka-jo Hall, regaining it in a no disqualification match on July 1 at G1 Special in USA. They lost the title to Killer Elite Squad in a three-way match, also involving Guerrillas of Destiny, on September 24 at Destruction in Kobe.

WWE (2018–present)
On January 16, 2018, WWE announced that Hanson had signed a contract with the company and would be reporting to the WWE Performance Center. On March 17, 2018, Hanson and tag team partner, Rowe made their NXT debut at a house show, defeating the team of Adrian Jaoude & Cezar Bononi in their first match. On the edition of April 11, 2018 of NXT, he and Rowe, dubbed War Machine, made their TV debuts, attacking Heavy Machinery (Otis Dozovic and Tucker Knight) and the team of Riddick Moss and Tino Sabbatelli. Two days later on the April 13, 2018 edition of NXT, they went on to defeat the team of Danny Burch and Oney Lorcan.

Throughout the beginning of the year, the team of Hanson & Rowe, now dubbed the War Raiders would continue their winning streak, by defeating several tag teams in the NXT division, including The Mighty and Heavy Machinery. At NXT TakeOver: WarGames (2018) in Los Angeles, War Raiders would team up with Ricochet and Pete Dunne in the main event to defeat The Undisputed Era in the eponymous WarGames match. At NXT TakeOver: Phoenix, War Raiders would defeat the team of Kyle O'Reilly and Roderick Strong to win the NXT Tag Team Championship. On April 15, 2019, they debuted on Raw as The Viking Experience under the new ring names of Erik (Rowe) and Ivar (Hanson). The following week, their name was changed to The Viking Raiders.

On September 7, 2020, on Raw, The Viking Raiders teamed up with Apollo Crews and Ricochet in an eight-man tag team match against The Hurt Business in a losing effort, where Cedric Alexander scored the pinfall over Ricochet.The match was forced to an abrupt ending due to Ivar suffering a legitimate cervical injury during the match. On September 14, Ivar underwent successful surgery to repair a neck injury.

Ivar would return to in ring action on April 12 edition of Raw, teaming up with his tag team partner Erik going up against Shelton Benjamin and Cedric Alexander in a winning effort.

As part of the 2021 Draft, both Ivar and Erik were drafted to the SmackDown brand.

Personal life
Todd Smith, along with his teammate Raymond Rowe, are straight edge.

Other media
Ivar made his video game debut as part of the Titans Pack of downloadable characters available for WWE 2K19.

Championships and accomplishments

Brew City Wrestling
BCW Tag Team Championship (1 time) – with Raymond Rowe
Chaotic Wrestling
Chaotic Wrestling Heavyweight Championship (3 times)
Chaotic Wrestling Tag Team Championship (2 times) – with Psycho
Lethal Lottery Battle Royal (2007)
Millennium Wrestling Federation
MWF Heavyweight Championship (1 time)
MWF Tag Team Championship (1 time) – with Beau Douglas
New Japan Pro-Wrestling
IWGP Heavyweight Tag Team Championship (2 times) – with Raymond Rowe
NWA New England
NWA New England Television Championship (1 time)
NWA New England Tag Team Championship (1 time) – Beau Douglas
New England Championship Wrestling
NECW Unified Television Championship (2 times).
IRON 8 Championship (2010)
NECW Unified Television Championship Tournament (2008)
New England Wrestling Alliance
NEWA Heavyweight Championship (1 time)
Northeast Wrestling
NEW Heavyweight Championship (1 time)
King of Bethany Tournament (2015)
Pro Wrestling Illustrated
Ranked No. 108 of the top 500 singles wrestlers in the PWI 500 in 2016.
Ring of Honor
ROH World Tag Team Championship (1 time) – with Ray Rowe
Top Prospect Tournament (2014).
Ultimate Championship Wrestling
UCW Tag Team Championship (1 time) – with Beau Douglas
VIP Wrestling
VIP Tag Team Championship (1 time) – with Raymond Rowe
What Culture Pro Wrestling
WCPW Tag Team Championship (1 time) – with Ray Rowe
WWE
NXT Tag Team Championship (1 time) – with Rowe
WWE Raw Tag Team Championship (1 time) – with Erik
Xtreme Wrestling Alliance
XWA Heavyweight Championship (1 time)
Other titles
OW Tag Team Championship (1 time) – with Psycho

References

External links
 
 
 
 Online World of Wrestling Profile
 
 

1984 births
Living people
Sportspeople from Lynn, Massachusetts
American male professional wrestlers
Professional wrestlers from Massachusetts
NXT Tag Team Champions
21st-century professional wrestlers
ROH World Tag Team Champions
IWGP Heavyweight Tag Team Champions